Fabian Schnellhardt (born 12 January 1994) is a German professional footballer who plays as a midfielder for SV Darmstadt 98.

Club career
Schnellhardt joined the youth set-up of 1. FC Köln from Rot-Weiß Erfurt, and he advanced through the club's youth system, making his debut for the second team in a 1–1 draw with Wuppertaler SV in Regionalliga West on 5 August 2012. After establishing himself in the second team, Schnellhardt made his 2. Bundesliga debut for Köln as a late substitute in a 4–1 win against Erzgebirge Aue on 1 September 2013.

He joined MSV Duisburg for the 2014–15 season.

He was loaned out to Holstein Kiel for the 2015–16 season. After returning to Duisburg for three more years, he was signed by SV Darmstadt for the 2019–20 season.

International career
Schnellhardt has represented Germany at every level up to under-20, and he was a member of the German squad at both the 2011 FIFA Under-17 World Cup and the 2011 UEFA European Under-17 Football Championship.

References

External links

Living people
1994 births
People from Leinefelde-Worbis
German footballers
Footballers from Thuringia
Association football midfielders
Germany youth international footballers
1. FC Köln players
MSV Duisburg players
Holstein Kiel players
SV Darmstadt 98 players
2. Bundesliga players
3. Liga players